Training weapon may refer to:
waster, a practice weapon, usually a sword
bokken, a Japanese wooden sword used for training
pugil stick, a heavily padded pole-like training weapon

See also
Weapons training (disambiguation)